The Ministry for Education of Lower Saxony is one of 10 ministries in Lower Saxony. The office is located at the Hans-Böckler-Allee 5 in Hanover.

The current Minister is Grant Hendrik Tonne (SPD) who has been the Minister since 22 November 2017. The current state secretary is Gaby Willamowius who was appointed by Grant Hendrik Tonne.

References 

Government ministries of Germany